John Boyle (born 22 October 1986) is a Scottish footballer who played for Airdrieonians, as a striker. He formerly played for Townhead Amateurs, Raith Rovers, Stirling Albion and Auchinleck Talbot. Boyle captained Airdrie, and was attacked in October 2014 by a fan after a game in which he did not play. After leaving Airdrie in 2015 he was linked with a return to Junior football with Pollok.

References

1986 births
Living people
Scottish footballers
Raith Rovers F.C. players
East Fife F.C. players
Stirling Albion F.C. players
Auchinleck Talbot F.C. players
Airdrieonians F.C. players
Scottish Football League players
Scottish Professional Football League players
Association football forwards